Milan Fashion Week is a clothing trade show held semi-annually in Milan, Italy. Upcoming autumn/winter fashions are showcased in February/March of each year, and upcoming spring/summer fashions are showcased in September/October of each year. It is one of the most important  worldwide.

History and operations
Milan Fashion Week, which was established in 1958, is part of the global "Big Four fashion weeks", the others being Paris Fashion Week, London Fashion Week and New York Fashion Week. The schedule begins with New York, followed by London, and then Milan, and ending with Paris. Since the year 1958, Milan Fashion Week has been taking place semi-annually with a women's and a men’s fashion week.

Milan Fashion Week is partially organized by the National Chamber of Italian Fashion, a non-profit association which disciplines, co-ordinates, and promotes the development of Italian fashion and is responsible for hosting the fashion events and shows of Milan. The , was set up on 11 June 1958.

Proprietors of the most important establishments in Italy, including some private establishments, which, in those days, played a crucial role in the promotion of this sector, were present at the Memorandum of Association: Roberto Capucci, Emilio Schuberth, Maria Antonelli, Princess Caracciolo Ginnetti, Alberto Fagiani, Giovanni Cesare Guidi, Germana Marucelli, Simonetta Colonna Di Cesarò, Jole Veneziani, Francesco Borrello, Giovanni Battista Giorgini, and the lawyer Pietro Parisio.

The events dedicated to women's fashion are the most important (Womenswear / Milan SS Women Ready to Wear, and Milano Moda Donna being the major fashion shows). The summer events dedicated to men include Menswear and Milano Moda Uomo.

In 2013 the Autumn/Winter Milan Fashion Week started on January 20 with Paola Frani, and was followed by shows from major fashion houses such as Armani, Roberto Cavalli, Dolce & Gabbana, Etro, Fendi, Ferragamo, Gucci, Jil Sander, Marni, Max Mara, Missoni, Moschino, Philipp Plein, Prada, Pucci, John Richmond, Tod's, and Versace etc. but also by shows from new labels and younger designers such as Au Jour Le Jour, Cristiano Burani, Gabriele Colangelo, Marco De Vincenzo, Stella Jean, Chicca Lualdi, MSGM, N°21, Fausto Puglisi, Francesco Scognamiglio etc. On 20 November 2013, Giorgio Armani announced he has decided to join the Italian Chamber of Fashion.

In April 2015, Carlo Capasa was named president of the Camera Nazionale Della Moda Italiana.

Certain shows are not held in conjunction with the Camera Nazionale Della Moda Italiana, including Dolce & Gabbana. The Camera Nazionale Della Moda Italiana has also been sharply criticized by designers such as Cavalli.

2020–2022: Milano Digital Fashion Weeks
Due to the COVID-19 pandemic, the 2020 edition took place only through digital media from 14 July to 17 July 2020. In 2022, Gucci made a debut at Milan Fashion Week, finding 68 pairs of twins to showcase their design.

Locations
Milan fashion week includes more than 40 shows each season and transforms the city into a touristic hob by simply creating various venues for the shows selecting the most elegant and influential palaces to become the stage for design. Example of location are Palazzo Reale, Palazzo Serbelloni and many others.

Controversy

In 2014 Greenpeace protested to demand "toxic-free fashion" by hanging signs in the Galleria Vittorio Emanuele II. Chiara Campione of Greenpeace Italy said the demonstration was set up to "...ask Italian brands, especially Versace, because it has the highest level of hazardous chemicals in its products, to publicly commit to eliminate harmful substances from the various stages of production."

Key revenues

 Attendees / Visitors: 30,000
 Total Income: €64 million
 City Income: €15.5 million
 Business Income: €48.5 million
 Venue Income: €7 million 
 Restaurant Income: €22 million 
 Retail Income: €26 million
 Accommodation Income: €9 million
 Average Expenditure per Visitor: €1,902

See also 
Berlin Fashion Week
London Fashion Week
New York Fashion Week
Paris Fashion Week
Shanghai Fashion Week
São Paulo Fashion Week

References

External links

Milan Fashion Week Official Site
Milan Fashion Week Womenswear
Milan Fashion Week Menswear
Milan Fashion Week 2019 Gucci News

Fashion events in Italy
1958 establishments in Italy
Recurring events established in 1958
Italian fashion
Annual events in Italy
Fashion weeks
Tourist attractions in Milan